ʿAbd Allāh ibn ʿAlī ibn Abī Ṭālib was one of Ali's sons who was killed in Karbala in 680, and is considered among the martyrs of the Battle of Karbala. Abdullah is also among the four sons of Umm al-Banin, the daughter of Hazam.

Battle of Karbala 

Historians have written about Abdullah ibn Ali ibn Abi Talib that on the day of Ashura, when the companions of Husayn ibn Ali and many of his family were killed, Abbas ibn Ali called out his brothers in age order and told them to attack on the battlefield. Abdullah ibn Ali was the first one who was called in order to fight Umar ibn Sa'd's army. Abbas said to him:

"O my brother, you first go to the battle field, because you don't have children (to be sad of the kid(s)). I want to see you to be killed in the way of Allah, and to be patient in your martyrdom."

So Abdullah went to the battlefield and recited epic verse(s).  Then he embarked onto the battlefield striking out with his sword.  Eventually Hani ibn Thabit attacked him and struck Abdullah on his head killing him.  He was twenty five years old. Hani ibn Thabit's name was mentioned in the Ziyarat al-Nahiya al-Muqaddasa and by Ja'far ibn Ali ibn Abi as the killer of Abdullah Talib.

References 

People killed at the Battle of Karbala
Children of Ali